The 2014–15 Coastal Carolina Chanticleers men's basketball team represented Coastal Carolina University during the 2014–15 NCAA Division I men's basketball season. The Chanticleers, led by eighth year head coach Cliff Ellis, played their home games at the HTC Center and were members of the Big South Conference. They finished the season 24–10, 12–6 in Big South play to finish in a three-way tie for third place. They defeated UNC Asheville, Gardner–Webb, and Winthrop to become champions of the Big South tournament. They earned an automatic bid to the NCAA tournament where they lost in the first round to Wisconsin.

Roster

Schedule

|-
!colspan=9 style="background:#; color:white;"| Regular season

 

|-
!colspan=9 style="background:#; color:white;"|Big South tournament

|-
!colspan=9 style="background:#; color:white;"| NCAA tournament

References

Coastal Carolina Chanticleers men's basketball seasons
Coastal Carolina
Coastal Carolina